The 2022–23 season is the 103rd in the history of SK Austria Klagenfurt and their second consecutive season in the top flight. The club are participating in the Austrian Football Bundesliga and the Austrian Cup.

Players

First team squad

Out on loan

Transfers

Pre-season and friendlies

Competitions

Overall record

Austrian Football Bundesliga

League table

Results summary

Results by round

Matches 
The league fixtures were announced on 22 June 2022.

Austrian Cup

References

SK Austria Klagenfurt (2007)
Austria Klagenfurt